The University at Buffalo School of Engineering and Applied Sciences, or UB Engineering, is the largest public engineering school in the state of New York and is home to eight departments. Established in 1946, UB Engineering is ranked 59th by U.S. News & World Report and has an annual research expenditure of $72 million.

Moving to Davis Hall 

Since May 10, 2012 UB Engineering has officially moved to its new home, Davis Hall. The building, as a part of UB 2020 Strategic Plan, hosts Computer Science and Electrical Engineering departments.

Department locations 
 Bell Hall - Industrial and Systems Engineering, Mechanical and Aerospace Engineering 
 Bonner Hall - Biomedical Engineering, Engineering Development and Alumni Relations, Undergraduate Education Offices
 Davis Hall - Computer Science and Engineering, Electrical Engineering, Dean's Office
 Furnas Hall - Chemical and Biological Engineering, Mechanical and Aerospace Engineering
 Jarvis Hall - Civil, Structural and Environmental Engineering (Environmental Engineering), Mechanical and Aerospace Engineering
 Ketter Hall - Civil, Structural and Environmental Engineering (Civil Engineering)

Departments 

The school includes eight departments offering undergraduate, graduate and professional degrees in following disciplines:
 Biomedical Engineering (BME)
 Chemical and Biological Engineering (CBE)
 Civil, Structural and Environmental Engineering (CSEE)
 Computer Science and Engineering (CSE)
 Electrical Engineering (EE)
 Industrial and Systems Engineering (ISE)
 Materials Science and Engineering (MSE)
 Mechanical and Aerospace Engineering (MAE)
 Computational Data Science and Engineering (CDSE)

Main research areas 

UB Engineering has six schoolwide Research Areas as follow:

 Bioactivities
 Infrastructure and Environment
 Photonics, Microelectronics and Materials
 Information Technology and Computing
 Energy, Flows and Materials Processing
 Virtualization, Simulation and Modelling

Research Centers and Labs 
 Center for Biomedical Engineering (CBE)
 Center of Excellence for Document Analysis and Recognition (CEDAR)
 Center for Excellence in Global Enterprise Management (GEM)
 Center of Hybrid Nanodevices and Systems (CoHNS)
 Center for Unified Biometrics and Sensors (CUBS)
 Center of Excellence in Information Systems Assurance Research and Education (CEISARE)
 Center for Integrated Waste Management (CIWM)
 Center for Multisource Information Fusion (CMIF)
 New York State Center of Excellence in Materials Informatics (NYSCEMI)
 Energy Systems Institute (ESI)
 Great Lakes Program (GLP)
 MCEER: Earthquake Engineering to Extreme Events (MCEER)
 New York State Center for Engineering Design and Industrial Innovation (NYSCEDII)
 Research Institute for Safety and Security in Transportation (RISST)
 The Center for Industrial Effectiveness (TCIE)
 Structural Engineering and Earthquake Simulation Laboratory (SEESL)
 Center for Computational Research (CCR)
 Institute for Lasers, Photonics and Biophotonics (Photonics)
 Center for Spin Effects and Quantum Information in Nanostructures (CSEQuIN)
 Buffalo Center for Biomedical Computing (BCBC)
 Center for Cognitive Sciences (COGSCI)
 Research Institute for Safety and Security in Transportation (RISST)
 Calspan-University at Buffalo Research Center (CUBRC) (member of the Alliance for Biosecurity, a group of biopharmaceutical companies and universities that promote the development of medical countermeasures for bioterrorist attacks or infectious disease pandemics)
 Center for Excellence in Home Health and Well-Being through Adaptive Smart Environment (Home BASE)
 Institute for Sustainable Transportation and Logistics (ISTL)
 Institute for Bridge Engineering (IBE)

Deans

Alumni 

As of 2016, the school of engineering and applied sciences has 30,000+ alumni in 50 states and 70 countries.

Notable alumni 

 Norman McCombs, Bachelors in Mechanical Engineering, won National Medal of Technology for his portable oxygen source inventions and refinements
 Erich Bloch, Director of the National Science Foundation from 1984 to 1990 and recipient of the National Medal of Technology and Innovation
 Wilson Greatbach, Recipient of the Lemelson–MIT Prize and National Medal of Technology and Innovation in 1990
 Gregory Jarvis, NASA Astronaut and American engineer who died during the destruction of the Space Shuttle Challenger on mission STS-51-L
 Robin Yanhong Li, billionaire and founder of Baidu, the largest search engine in China.
 Christopher Scolese, director of the NASA Goddard Space Flight Center
 Ira Flatow, Emmy Award winner and host of National Public Radio's popular, Science Friday
 Angelo F. Coniglio, American civil engineer, educator, genealogist and author
 Shenthuran Maheswaran, Global Peace Ambassador for Sri Lanka at Global Peace Index
 Jeffrey Umland, PhD in Mechanical Engineering, is the chief mechanical engineer for the Curiosity Rover, NASA’s Mars Science laboratory project.

References 

1946 establishments in New York (state)
University at Buffalo
Educational institutions established in 1946
Engineering schools and colleges in the United States
Engineering universities and colleges in New York (state)
University subdivisions in New York (state)